Flight Log: Arrival is the sixth extended play by the South Korean male group Got7. It was released on March 13, 2017 under the label of JYP Entertainment. It features the single "Never Ever". The album is the third and last entry into the group's Flight Log series.

Track listing

Charts

Accolades

Music program awards

References

2017 EPs
Got7 EPs
Korean-language EPs
JYP Entertainment EPs
Genie Music EPs